Irene van den Broek (born 26 August 1980) is a former road cyclist from the Netherlands. She represented her nation at the 2007 UCI Road World Championships and 2008 UCI Road World Championships.

See also
 2008 AA-Drink Cycling Team season
 2011 AA Drink-leontien.nl season

References

External links
 profile at Procyclingstats.com

1980 births
Dutch female cyclists
Living people
Sportspeople from Nijmegen
UCI Road World Championships cyclists for the Netherlands
Cyclists from Gelderland
20th-century Dutch women
21st-century Dutch women